Akito Fukumori (福森 晃斗, born December 16, 1992) is a Japanese football player for Hokkaido Consadole Sapporo.

Club statistics
Updated to 18 February 2019.

References

External links

Profile at Consadole Sapporo 

1992 births
Living people
Association football people from Kanagawa Prefecture
Japanese footballers
J1 League players
J2 League players
Kawasaki Frontale players
Hokkaido Consadole Sapporo players
Association football defenders